An Excellent Servant But a Terrible Master is the debut studio album of Pyrrhon, released on September 2, 2011 by Selfmadegod.

Track listing

Personnel
Adapted from the An Excellent Servant But a Terrible Master liner notes.

Pyrrhon
 Alex Cohen – drums
 Dylan DiLella – electric guitar
 Erik Malave – bass guitar
 Doug Moore – vocals

Production and additional personnel
 Caroline Harrison – cover art, design
 Colin Marston – mastering
 Dan Pilla – recording, mixing
 Kyle Smith – additional vocals (1)

Release history

References

External links 
 An Excellent Servant But a Terrible Master at Discogs (list of releases)
 An Excellent Servant But a Terrible Master at Bandcamp

2011 debut albums
Pyrrhon (band) albums